Gascoyne was an electoral district of the Legislative Assembly in the Australian state of Western Australia from 1890 to 1989.

The district was located in the Western Australian outback, in the north-west of the state. It was one of the original 30 seats contested at the 1890 election. In 1898, its major settlement was Carnarvon and it also included some outlying pastoral leases like Middalya Station. The seat was abolished ahead of the 1989 election. In

The district's most famous member was Frank Wise of the Labor Party, who served as Premier of Western Australia from 1945 to 1947.

Members for Gascoyne

Election results

References

Gascoyne
1890 establishments in Australia
1989 disestablishments in Australia
Constituencies established in 1890
Constituencies disestablished in 1989
Electoral district